The Habana Formation is a geologic formation in Cuba. It preserves mainly gastropod and rudist fossils dating back to the Late Campanian to Maastrichtian periods. The formation was defined by Robert H. Palmer in 1934.

See also 
 List of fossiliferous stratigraphic units in Cuba

References

Bibliography

Further reading 
 
 N. F. Sohl and H. A. Kollmann. 1985. Cretaceous Actaeonellid Gastropods from the Western Hemisphere. United States Geological Survey Professional Paper 1304:1-104
 A. Torre. 1960. Notas sobre rudistas [Notes about rudists]. Memorias de la Sociedad Cubana de Historia Natural 25(1):51-64

Geologic formations of Cuba
Cretaceous Cuba
Campanian Stage
Maastrichtian Stage of North America
Limestone formations
Shallow marine deposits
Formations
Formations